Plan B is a 2019 Kenyan-Nigerian romantic comedy film written, directed and edited by the Nigerian filmmaker, Lowladee. The film stars Kenyan actress and producer Sarah Hassan, Catherine Kamau Karanja, and Nigerian actor Daniel Etim Effiong who are the lead actors.

The film won the Best East African movie Award at the 2020 Africa Magic Viewers' Choice Awards (AMVCAs).

Production
The film was produced by Lowladee  in collaboration with Alfajiri Productions, a Kenyan production company.

Synopsis
After breaking up with her boyfriend Ethan (Lenana Kariba), Lisa Waweru (Sarah Hassan) meets a strange man and becomes pregnant after engaging in a one-night stand with him. Later, Lisa learns  that the man is Dele Cooker (Daniel Etim Effiong), the Nigerian CEO of a spreading Nairobi-based company. Alongside her friend Joyce (Catherine Kamau), she hatches a plan to make Dele claim responsibility for the pregnancy.

Cast
 Sarah Hassan as Lisa
 Catherine Kamau Karanja as Joyce
 Daniel Etim Effiong as Dele Coker
 Lenana Kariba as Ethan
 Justin Mirichi as Dele's Lawyer
 Chantelle Naisola as Mumbi
 Zarhaa Kassam as Sara
 Maina wa Ndungu as Doctor
 Mary Gacheri as Lisa's grandma
 Patience Baraka as Dele's call girl
 Silas Ambani as Dele's P.A.
 Tracy Amadi as Boutique attendant

Release
The movie was released on Valentine's day, Friday 14 February 2019. It was premiered on NTV (Kenya) the night before the global release.

References

External links
 

2019 films
Swahili-language films
2019 romantic comedy films
Films set in 2019
Kenyan comedy films
Nigerian comedy films